Precious Memories may refer to:

 Precious Memories (hymn), a traditional Gospel hymn credited to J. B. F. Wright
 Precious Memories (Alan Jackson album), 2006
 Precious Memories (Dolly Parton album), 1999

See also
 Sings Precious Memories, a 1975 album by Johnny Cash